Morávka Dam is a water reservoir and dam near Morávka, Moravian-Silesian Region, Czech Republic. The dam is built on the Morávka River and has a surface of 0.795 km². It was constructed in 1961–1966.

The dam is a popular spot for sport fishing and other recreational activities. The dam is also used to supply drinking water to nearby towns and to subdue floods on Morávka and Ostravice rivers.

References

External links 
  Entry at Odra Basin website

Dams in the Czech Republic
Frýdek-Místek District
Cieszyn Silesia
Moravian-Silesian Beskids
Buildings and structures in the Moravian-Silesian Region
Dams completed in 1966